Katie Bender Wynn (born 5 October 1985) is an Australian filmmaker based in Los Angeles. She made her feature-length directing debut with the 2016 documentary The Will To Fly about Australian Olympic freestyle skier gold medalist Lydia Lassila.

Life and education

Bender is a former gymnast and freestyle skier, and trained on the Australian freestyle aerial ski team. Bender attended Methodist Ladies College in Victoria, Melbourne where she could study and train at a high-performance gymnastics center based on campus. At 16 years old, Bender was recruited by The Olympic Winter Institute of Australia to join an athlete talent pathway program which converted gymnasts into freestyle aerial skiers.

Bender studied film and digital media at Fashion Institute of Design & Merchandising based in Los Angeles, California. After graduation, she interned and began working at Trailer Park Inc, a motion picture marketing firm in Hollywood.

Bender was the producer and director of the 2016 feature documentary 'The Will To Fly' about Australian Olympic freestyle skier gold medalist Lydia Lassila. Bender is an ex-teammate of Lydia and was inspired to make The Will To Fly in 2012 while visiting Lydia at a training camp in Utah. Lydia was the defending Olympic champion at the time and had just returned to the sport as a first-time mother. Bender realised the potential for a feature-length film when Lydia explained her sporting aspirations to narrow the gap between male and female capabilities by performing a "quad triple twisting, triple somersault" at the 2014 Winter Olympics in Sochi.

In February 2017, Bender performed at the TED conference "Finding Our Fire" in Canberra. Her talk "Conquering Uncertainty With Tenacity" was about her life, missed Olympic dreams, and re-discovering the "driving force that exists within all of us when we find that one thing we truly love".

Film

The Will To Fly

''The Will To Fly'' was five years in the making and one of Australia's first feature-length sports documentaries about the life and tumultuous sports career of freestyle aerial skiing Olympic Champion, Lydia Lassila. The film made its Australian premiere in Melbourne on International Women's Day (8 March) 2016 followed by a theatrical release, where it was positively received by critics. The film was quoted "The Most Inspirational Movie of the Year" by The Huffington Post Australia.

Impact
In October 2015, before the release of The Will To Fly, the film was used as a catalyst in convincing the Government of New South Wales to invest in a $10 million Olympic training facility so that the Australian Winter Olympic team could train on home soil.

In August 2017, Olympic champion hurdler Sally Pearson made headlines worldwide after coming out of retirement to win the 2017 world championship title. Pearson told the media that her comeback to the sport was motivated after watching The Will To Fly on a plane in 2016.

Filmography
’’The Will To Fly’’ (2016) – director
’’We Champion’’ (2021) – director
’’Matildas: The World At Our Feet’’ (2023) – director

Film awards and nominations
The Will To Fly
 Winner, Best World Documentary Award, Whistler Film Festival 2016
 Winner, Best Mountain Culture Film Award, Whistler Film Festival 2016
 Winner, Award Of Excellence, Impact Doc Awards 2017
 Nomination, EDA Award for Best Female-Directed Documentary from the Alliance of Women Film Journalists, Whistler Film Festival 2016
 Nomination, APRA AMCOS award for Best Music in Documentary, APRA AMCOS Awards Australia 2016

References

External links

Living people
1985 births
Australian female freestyle skiers
People educated at Methodist Ladies' College, Melbourne
Australian film producers
Australian women film directors
Australian documentary filmmakers
Film directors from Melbourne
Women documentary filmmakers
Australian expatriates in the United States